The Biblioteca Estense (Estense Library), was the family library of the marquis and dukes of Este. The exact date of the library's birth is still under speculation, however it is known for certain that the library was in use during the fourteenth century. Whilst it was greatly enriched during the Renaissance years in Ferrara, the library was concretely established in Modena in the beginning of the seventeenth century. It is known as one of the most important libraries in Italy. The library is located, along with the Galleria Estense directly below its collection of artworks, in the Palazzo dei Musei (Piazza Sant'Agostino 337) in Modena.

History 
On the ascension of the Marquis Niccolò III d'Este to the Ferrarese duchy in 1393, he inherited an important humanistic library, rich in works of literary, historical and artistic content. Its collection grew considerably during the Renaissance period with manuscripts and printed editions considered today to be of fundamental value, thanks to the refined and attentive patronage of the Dukes of Este. In 1598, the Library followed the dynasty when the capital was transferred from Ferrara to Modena.

In the following centuries, the Estense Library continued to be enriched with local and international works, funded by the acquisitions of suppressed religious institutions as well as enriched by the elevated tastes of famous librarians Ludovico Antonio Muratori and Girolamo Tiraboschi. After the Unification of Italy, the Estense Library merged with the University Library, which brought with it an important collection of philosophical, juridical and scientific texts. Thus was born the Estense University Library, considered today as a modern institute of national interest.

Collection 

Today the Library's collection contains more than 500,000 printed works, about 11,000 codexes, more than 100,000 manuscript leaves, and 1,662 incunabula. Among the manuscripts, the most famous is the 1,200-page Bible of Borso d'Este, extensively bordered with miniatures. The relic would be recovered and returned to Modena following the first World War. Bought at an auction, it was gifted to Italy on behalf of Senator Giovanni Treccani. The Bible is today excluded from public view for reasons of conservation, a 1963 replica now takes its place in the Biblioteca Estense.

The library holds many medieval manuscripts, among them biblical manuscripts: Codex Mutinensis, Minuscule 358, 359, 585, 586, 618, ℓ 111.

Also known worldwide is its collection of musical manuscripts and printed books, the Raccolta musicale estense.

Some manuscripts 

 Biblia Borsi Estensis
 Codex Mutinensis
 Codex de sphaera
Mutinensis gr. 122
 Minuscule 585
 Minuscule 586
 Minuscule 358
 Minuscule 359
 Minuscule 618
 Lectionary 111

References

Related entries
 Gallerie Estensi
 Borso d'Este
 Galleria Estense
House of Este

Further reading 
 Giulio Bertoni, La Biblioteca Estense, Torino 1903
 Archivi di biblioteche: per la storia delle biblioteche pubbliche statali, Roma: Ed. di storia e letteratura, 2002

External links 
 Biblioteca Estense official website. Mid-resolution PDF's of some manuscripts and printed books can be downloaded for free from the Immagini (Images) section
 Direttori della Biblioteca Estense di Modena, with links to biographical sources
 Biblioteca Estense images
 Biblioteca Estense: sei secoli di storia at the mediateca2000

 
Libraries in Ferrara
Buildings and structures in Modena
House of Este
Education in Emilia-Romagna